Chatham was a supermarket chain, now-defunct, headquartered in southeastern Michigan, United States. Founded by Royal Supermarkets in the mid-1950s, Chatham was often compared to Kroger in size and selection. Typical of many grocery stores of its time, Chatham was unable to keep up with big-box grocery competitors, including Michigan-based Meijer. Kroger subsequently purchased former Chatham locations after the chain went out of business.

Demise
In 1986, Chatham was then owned by Nu-Trax, Inc., headed by Wendell Smith. In March 1986, the company was purchased by Alex Dandy, a businessman who owned Hamady Brothers food chain in Flint, Michigan. Dandy illegally diverted assets of the company to his personal benefit, and Chatham was forced to file for bankruptcy in 1987. Dandy was convicted in 1991, of tax offenses, mail fraud, bankruptcy fraud, and obstruction of justice. He died in 2003.

References

External links

Chatham memories - site for former Chatham employees. Includes history of company

Retail companies established in the 1950s
Retail companies disestablished in 1987
Defunct companies based in Michigan
Defunct supermarkets of the United States
Bankrupt companies of the United States
Companies that filed for Chapter 11 bankruptcy in 1987
1987 disestablishments in Michigan